Emanuel Kegel (1655 – 23 June 1724) was a German Baroque composer.

Born in Gotha, Kegel was initially music director in Neustadt bei Coburg, then in Gera. He is primarily remembered as the teacher of Gottfried Heinrich Stölzel who was his pupil at Gera from 1703 to 1707.

He died in Breslau.

Works, editions and recordings
Nothing was published during his lifetime.

 Cantata Nichts ist suesser als die Liebe Klaus Mertens, Accademia Daniel, dir Shalev Ad-El, 2007.

References

1655 births
1724 deaths
18th-century classical composers
18th-century German composers
18th-century German male musicians
German Baroque composers
German classical composers
German male classical composers